Melick may refer to:
 Charles W. Melick, head coach of the University of Maryland college football program
 Melick en Herkenbosch now the municipality of Roerdalen
 Balthazar P. Melick (1770–1835), also known as Baltus P. Melick, founder of Chemical Bank and Melick & Burger
 Melica, a genus of grasses